Lampyris algerica is a species of firefly in the genus Lampyris. It lives in Algeria and is commonly known as a glowworm, although this name is not specific to the species.

References

Lampyridae
Bioluminescent insects
Beetles described in 1869